Ramiro Finco (born 10 January 1992, Buenos Aires) is an Argentine rugby union player.
His usual position is as a Centre and he currently plays for Viadana in Top12. 

After playing for Argentina Under 20 in 2012, from 2013 to 2016 Finco was named in the Argentina Sevens for World Rugby Sevens Series.

References 

It's Rugby France Profile
ESPN Profile
Ultimate Rugby Profile

1992 births
Living people
Argentine rugby union players
Rugby union centres
Rugby Viadana players
Pan American Games medalists in rugby sevens
Pan American Games silver medalists for Argentina
Rugby sevens players at the 2015 Pan American Games
Medalists at the 2015 Pan American Games
Rugby union players from Buenos Aires